Paraschistura prashari is a species of stone loach endemic to Pakistan.

References

Footnotes 

prashari
Freshwater fish of Pakistan
Endemic fauna of Pakistan
Fish described in 1933